The Little Giant is a 1933 American pre-Code crime comedy romance. It follows the attempts of an ex-gangster to make his way into high society.

The film was directed by Roy Del Ruth and starring Edward G. Robinson and Mary Astor. It was produced and distributed through Warner Bros.

The Library of Congress has preserved a print of this film.

Plot
Mobster Jim (Bugs) Ahearn, Edward G. Robinson, realizing that the end of prohibition is only months away, decides to quit the bootlegging racket and work to elevate his culture and status by reading books and investing in art, and ultimately by leaving Chicago for Santa Barbara, where he attempts to fit into the upper crust of society. He invests in polo ponies, joins a polo team (he's terrible, but is tolerated because of his money), falls in love with Polly Cass, Helen Vinson. He is blind to the woman who truly loves him, Ruth Wayburn, Mary Astor. After sinking a massive amount of cash into Polly's father's investment firm, which, unbeknownst to Bugs, is crooked and on the verge of bankruptcy, the Cass family discovers Bugs' criminal past. They cancel his engagement to Polly and plan to flee to Europe. When Bugs finds out, he calls in his old gang from Chicago, who, through a variety of means, retrieve Bugs' money from the crooked investors. He ultimately realizes that Ruth is the girl for him, and we close on the couple watching his uncouth mobsters playing a most unorthodox version of a polo game.

Cast
Edward G. Robinson - Bugs Ahearn
Mary Astor - Ruth Wayburn
Helen Vinson - Polly Cass
Russell Hopton - Al Daniels
Kenneth Thomson - John Stanley
Shirley Grey - Edith Merriam
Berton Churchill - Donald Hadley Cass
Donald Dillaway - Gordon Cass
Louise Mackintosh - Mrs. Dudley Hadley Cass
Adrian Morris as Seated Milano Hood

References

External links

1933 films
1930s crime comedy films
1933 romantic comedy films
American black-and-white films
American crime comedy films
American romantic comedy films
1930s English-language films
Films directed by Roy Del Ruth
First National Pictures films
Warner Bros. films
1930s American films